Sanoshree,Taratal,Dhodhari and Suryapatuwa is a Village development committee Before federalism in Nepal (20 september 2015) Now all village development committees have formed a municipality named Madhuvan. development committee in Bardiya District in Lumbini Province of south-western Nepal. At the time of the 1991 Nepal census it had a population of 12,542 and had 2266 houses in the town.

References

Populated places in Bardiya District